The Bishuo language is an extinct or nearly extinct southern Bantoid language of Cameroon. It was spoken in the North West Province, Menchum Department, Furu-Awa Subdivision, Ntjieka, Furu-Turuwa and the Furu-Sambari villages. It was related to Bikya language.  It was reported by Breton 1986 that the Bishuo people had shifted to Jukun, with apparently only one remaining person, over 60 years old, who knew any Bishuo.

References

Furu languages
Endangered languages of Africa
Languages of Cameroon